The National Monuments Council (Spanish: Consejo de Monumentos Nacionales) is a Chilean government agency dedicated to the preservation and upkeep of special natural and cultural sites in Chile. The National Monuments Council was created in 1925 by law Nº 17.288.

References

External links

Government of Chile
Government agencies established in 1925
Historic sites in Chile